Takydromus dorsalis, the Sakishima grass lizard, is a species of lizard in the family Lacertidae. It is endemic to the Yaeyama Islands (Ishigaki Island, Iriomote Island, Kohama Island and Kuroshima) in southern Japan.

Activity 
It is diurnal. The famles lay clutches of one to two eggs.

Threats 
The IUCN lists the species as endangered. Threats consist of habitat degradation and invasive peacocks.

References

Takydromus
Endemic reptiles of Japan
Reptiles described in 1904
Taxa named by Leonhard Stejneger